Dunipace Football Club are a Scottish football club based in Denny, Stirlingshire. Nicknamed the Pace, they were formed in 1888 and are based at Westfield Park.

The club won the Scottish Junior Cup in 1905–06, defeating Kirkintilloch Rob Roy 1–0 in a replay at Brockville Park, Falkirk, following a 2–2 draw in the first tie at Meadowside, Partick. Dunipace were also runners-up to Inverkeithing United in the final seven years later.

The club's management team of Danny Smith (Manager) and Alan Moffat (Assistant Manager) was appointed in November 2020. Both previously had spells as players with the club.

On 27 April 2018 the club announced that it had successfully applied to leave junior football and join the East of Scotland League for season 2018–19. As part of the club's move to senior football, its name was changed to reflect this, by dropping the term "Juniors". This was a part of a larger movement of junior clubs to the East of Scotland Football League.

At the start of their first season in senior football, the club's Westfield Park ground was upgraded with an artificial turf surface and floodlights installed, reopening in October 2018. Dunipace won their first trophy as a senior club in August 2021 after defeating Broomhill 3–1 in the delayed final of the 2019–20 South Challenge Cup.

Honours

Major honours

Scottish Junior Cup

 Winners: 1905–06
 Runners-up: 1912–13

Central League Division 1

 Runners-up: 2004–05

Central League Division 2

 Winners (3): 1972–73, 1981–82, 1998–99
 Runners-up 2008–09
SFA South Region Challenge Cup

 Winners: 2019–20

Other honours

 Stirling and District Junior Cup: 1898–99, 1899–90, 1900–91, 1901–02, 1902–03, 1904–05, 1905–06, 1912–13, 1919–20, 1920–21, 1921–22, 1922–23, 1932–33, 1933–34, 1934–35
 Stirlingshire Junior League Winners: 1900–01, 1901–02, 1902–03, 1903–04, 1904–05, 1906–07, 1907–08, 1908–09, 1912–13, 1913–14, 1914–15, 1919–20, 1920–21, 1921–22, 1922–23, 1923–24
 Stirlingshire Junior Cup: 1901–02, 1902–03, 1904–05, 1905–06, 1908–09, 1910–11, 1911–12, 1912–13, 1919–20, 1934–35
 Falkirk & District Junior Cup: 1901–02, 1902–03, 1903–04, 1905–06, 1908–09, 1911–12, 1912–13, 1920–21, 1921–22, 1922–23, 1927–28, 1929–30
 Denny and District Cottage Hospital Shield: 1901–02, 1904–05, 1905–06, 1906–07, 1907–08, 1908–09, 1909–10
 Stirlingshire Charity Cup: 1920–21
 Stirlingshire League Cup: 1920–21, 1921–22, 1922–23, 1923–24, 1926–27
 Scottish Junior League (Eastern) winners: 1927–28
 Victory Cup: 1927–28, 1938–39
 McLeod Trophy: 1972–73
 Centenary Cup: 1987–88
 Central Region Sectional League Cup: 1989–90
 Bert McNab Cup: 1992–93
 Evening Times Cup: 1998–99

References

External links
Official club site
Twitter

 
Football clubs in Scotland
Scottish Junior Football Association clubs
Football in Falkirk (council area)
Association football clubs established in 1888
1888 establishments in Scotland
East of Scotland Football League teams
Denny, Falkirk